Tuvalu competed at the 2019 Pacific Games in Apia, Samoa. The country participated in nine sports at the 2019 games. The Tuvaluan team was made up of 98 athletes, including 3 para-athletes: Esekai Vaega, Tanielu Soa, and Ioane Hawaii who received a gold medal in the Table Tennis, Men's Seated Singles division.

Athletics

Men
 Kaitu Kaitu - high jump
 Kanaee Saloa Tauia - 100 metres & 200 metres

Boxing

Tuvalu nominated three male boxers to compete in boxing at the 2019 games.

Men
 Alapati A'asa Jr
 Tuinanumea Teaukai
 Fiu Tui
Fiu Tui received a bronze medal, being placed third equal, in the Men's Middle Weight 75 kg event.

Football

Men's football

Powerlifting

Men
 Bernard Ewekia
 Telupe Iosefa
 Kaiau Alefaio
 Nakibae Kitiseni

Telupe Iosefa received a silver medal in the powerlifting 120 kg male division.

Rugby sevens

Tuvalu nominated thirteen male players for their rugby sevens squad to compete at the 2019 games. Elenoa Kunatuba was the Tuvalu men’s 7s coach; she selected seven new players for the games squad.

Men's team
 Petelu Paisi 
 Faaiu Paeniu
 Nafa Eitini
 Falegai Feagai
 Iosefa Teuina
 Howard Elisaia
 Sapolu Tetoa
 Toiola Iafeta
 Afesoi Sapakuka
 Jason Silo
 Foufusu Founuku
 Fuivai Vaelei
 James Soketa

Table tennis

Women
 Brenda Christine Katepu
 Betty Resture

Men
Ioane Hawaii received a gold medal in the Table Tennis, Men's Seated Singles division.

Volleyball

Beach volleyball

Men
 Saaga Malosa and Amalamo Talake.

Indoor Volleyball

Men
 Sasagi Kaupoe
 Fono Eric Ampelosa
 Reni Atoni
 Iefata Keli
 Ampelosa Luka
 Ata Biira
 Ampex Isaac
 Mitilelei Fiamalua
 Kaitalava Ieti
 Ikapoti Kaisami
 Kilifi Keli
 Tofinga Junior Tofinga
 Esau Teagai
 Viiga Poutoa
 Mafoa Perci Petaia
 Tauati Elisaia
 Taupale Suka
 Teatufalelima File

Weightlifting

Men
 Manuila Raobu
 Tuau Lapua Lapua

Women
 Lyn Niu

References

Nations at the 2019 Pacific Games
2019